The 2020–21 Ukrainian championship in football season was the 25th since it replaced the competition of physical culture clubs.

On 11 August 2020, the AAFU published information about the upcoming season with a tentative composition. The championship is expected to start on 29 August 2020.

On 5 September 2020 30 teams started the 25th Ukrainian championship in football among amateurs. The last season champion Viktoriya Mykolaivka are defending their title since declining their opportunity for promotion to professional competitions. The composition of the competition changed notable from the last season with 7 clubs being promoted, while other 9 clubs refused to continue their participation for this season. With competitions already ongoing on September 30 (Dnipro-1-Borysfen) and October 22 (Karpaty Lviv) two more teams also joined the competitions bringing the total number of participating clubs to 32.

Teams

Relegated professional clubs 
 None

Returning/reformed clubs 
 FC Skoruk Tomakivka (returning, last played season in 2018–19)
 Dnipro-1 Borysfen, late start — a farm team of SC Dnipro-1 was not to be fielded for the AAFU competitions due to the COVID-19 pandemic, but at the end of September it was announced that it will resume its participation.

Debut  
List of teams that are debuting this season in the league.

MFA Mukachevo, Yunist Verkhnia Bilka, Dovbush Chernivtsi, Liubomyr Stavyshche, Yednist Kyiv, FC Olimpiya Savyntsi, FC Sumy, SC Poltava, FC Kudrivka, imeni Lva Yashina Kyiv, Varatyk Kolomyia, AFSC Kyiv, Kryvbas-2 Kryvyi Rih (former Hirnyk-2), Metalurh-2 Zaporizhia, Karpaty Lviv (late start)

Withdrawn teams
List of clubs that took part in last year competition, but chose not to participate in 2020–21 season:

 Svitanok-Ahrosvit Shlyakhova
 LSTM 536
 Olimpik Kropyvnytskyi

 Kovel-Volyn
 Pokuttia Kolomyia
 Kremin-Yunior Kremenchuk

 Chernihiv-Avanhard
 Ahrodim Bakhmach
 Tavriya Novotroitske

Clubs that did not play last season in the league, but showed interest at first yet withdrew before the start of the season:
 FC OKKO Kharkiv

Merged teams / Name change
 Tavriya Novotroitske distanced itself from the Russian-occupied Crimea moving closer to Kakhovka (village Marianivka), later, before start of the competitions, merged with SC Tavriya Simferopol
 Livyi Bereh Kyiv, before 20 November 2020 was represented by imeni Lva Yashyna Kyiv which record was grandfathered. According to the AAFU information partner, the club is one and the same and was renamed. At the Football Federation of Kyiv, there are two separate clubs of the city federation. On 3 December 2020, the club officially announced about its first official training and preparation for the spring half.
 On 23 March 2021 Dnipro-1-Borysfen was renamed into Borysfen Dnipro

Location map 
The following displays the location of teams.

Stadiums
Group A
Group B
Group C

Notes:
 Reg — regional championship (Regions of Ukraine)
 Am[#] — AAFU championship where sign (#) indicates Group number

Group stage

Group 1

Notes

Group 2

Notes
First half of the season FC imeni Lva Yashina record was +1=0-9 10-45 and was replaced by FC Livyi Bereh.

Group 3

Notes
The AAFU awarded a technical win for Skoruk 3:0 and loss for Kryvbas-2 for the missed Round 5 game.

Final stage
To the stage qualify eight teams, selection of which is determined exclusively by the AAFU Commission in conducting competitions. Both stages quarterfinals and semifinals consist of two legs (home and away). The final game is scheduled to take place at neutral field.

Quarterfinals
Games are scheduled for 6 and 13 June 2021.

Semifinals
The draw for the semifinal round took place on 14 June 2021. Games are scheduled for 19 and 26 June 2021.

Final
The final game is scheduled for 30 June 2021.

|}

 Note: On 24 June 2021 both LNZ and Viktoriya were admitted to the Second League. FC LNZ Cherkasy became the third club in history of amateur competitions in Ukraine that won both regular season competition and Ukrainian Amateur Cup. Previously such feat was reached by FC Torpedo Zaporizhia in 1984 and FC KZEZO Kakhovka in 2004.

Promotions to the Second League
Six teams from AAFU are expected to be promoted to the 2021–22 season in Professional Football League (Article 18 of regulations). In early December 2020 it became known that at least 10 teams expressed their intention to receive club's license of the Professional Football League for the next season: MFA Mukachevo, Karpaty Lviv, Nyva Terebovlia, Atlet Kyiv, AFSC Kyiv, Viktoria Mykolaivka, Liubomyr Stavyshche, SC Poltava, FC Sumy, FC Trostianets.

On 7 June 2021 it was announced that 10-11 clubs plan to join the Second League as well as three new second teams. Among them are Karpaty Lviv (Tlumak's), MFA Mukachevo, LNZ-Lebedyn, Livyi Bereh Kyiv, Lyubomyr Stavyshche, AFSC Kyiv, FC Sumy, Skoruk Tomakivka, SC Poltava, Viktoriya Mykolaivka, FC Trostianets, Rukh-2 Lviv, Lviv-2, Kryvbas-2 Kryvyi Rih.

See also
 2020–21 Ukrainian Amateur Cup
 2020–21 Ukrainian Second League
 2020–21 Ukrainian First League
 2020–21 Ukrainian Premier League

Notes

References

External links
AAFU
The 2018–19 season's regulations. AAFU.

Ukrainian Football Amateur League seasons
Amateur
Ukraine